Borja may refer to:

People
 Borja (name)

Places

 Borja, Aragon, Aragon, Spain
 Campo de Borja, comarca containing that municipality as capital
 Borja, Peru, Loreto Region, Peru
 Borja (mountain), in Bosnia and Herzegovina
 Borja District in Guairá Department, Paraguay
 San Borja (disambiguation), multiple places